Bobby Lee Cook (February 12, 1927 – February 19, 2021) was an American defense attorney from Summerville, Georgia, in Chattooga County. He had practiced law since the late 1940s, and is known for combining a sharp legal mind with a folksy demeanor. He had represented a wide variety of clients, from rural Southerners to international businessmen and corporations. He was reputed to have been the inspiration for the television series Matlock main character Ben Matlock, which starred Andy Griffith as a Georgia attorney.

Early life and education
Cook was born in 1927 in Lyerly, Georgia. He attended Vanderbilt University Law School in Nashville, Tennessee. He practiced law in Summerville with the Cook & Connelly law firm.

Career
Cook had been a defense attorney for over 65 years. He recalled a time of racial prejudice when African Americans were "required to sit in the balcony of old courtrooms". He described it as "a most unusual, extraordinary time. It was a time when no women sat on juries, and certainly no blacks".

Cook was estimated to have won 80% of his murder trials and has "estimated his annual net income at $1 million".

Death 
Bobby Lee Cook died on February 19, 2021, aged 94.

Significant cases
Represented Wayne Williams, who appealed against his 1982 conviction for the murder of two black youths in what was known as the Atlanta Child Murders.
Represented Troy L. Griffith Jr., star running back for Trion High School, Trion, Georgia.
1986—Defended Tennessee banker C.H. Butcher Jr., who faced 25 counts of fraud. Butcher was acquitted on all counts.
1988—Represented former Auburn University All-American football star Bobby Hoppe, who was charged with murder in a 1957 shooting. Jurors deadlocked 10-2 for acquittal. The case was never retried.
1989—Defended Jim Williams during the first trial (of four) for the 1981 shooting death of Danny Hansford. The case was the inspiration for the book Midnight in the Garden of Good and Evil by John Berendt, published in 1994. Williams was convicted of the murder and sentenced to life in prison, although appealed, posting a $200,000 bond.  Cook later received, anonymously, a copy of the police report showing the arresting officer contradicted himself, and the verdict was overturned.  A new trial was ordered.

Notable quotes
"If you can railroad a bad man to prison, you can railroad a good man."

References

1927 births
2021 deaths
20th-century American lawyers
21st-century American lawyers
Georgia (U.S. state) lawyers
People from Chattooga County, Georgia
People from Summerville, Georgia
Vanderbilt University Law School alumni